Wang Shu-hua (born 21 March 1969) is a Taiwanese sprinter. She competed in the women's 4 × 100 metres relay at the 1988 Summer Olympics.

References

1969 births
Living people
Athletes (track and field) at the 1988 Summer Olympics
Taiwanese female sprinters
Taiwanese female long jumpers
Olympic athletes of Taiwan
Place of birth missing (living people)